Roberts is an unincorporated community in Doddridge County, West Virginia, United States. Its post office 
is closed

References 

Unincorporated communities in West Virginia
Unincorporated communities in Doddridge County, West Virginia